Arthur Christie (1921-2003) was seconded into Special Operations Executive on 22 April 1940 at Aston House, Stevenage, where he was to become one of the founding members of SOE. He was originally trained as an explosives expert, laying charges at the coalface as a miner. It was this expertise that became the reason he was seconded from the regular army into MI6 (R) based at Aston House; this was the place christened "Churchill’s Toy Box."

He was captured by the Japanese at the fall of Singapore.

His file is now open at the Public Record Office HS 9/313/1.

British Special Operations Executive personnel
British miners
1921 births
2003 deaths
People from Stoke-on-Trent
Loyal Regiment soldiers
British World War II prisoners of war
World War II prisoners of war held by Japan